The 2019 Chinese Women's Football League season was the league's 5th season in its current incarnation.

The season started on 29 June and concluded on 26 October. The number of the teams were expanded from 7 to 10.

Clubs

Club changes

From Super League
Teams relegated from 2018 Chinese Women's Super League
Hebei China Fortune

To Super League
Teams promoted to 2019 Chinese Women's Super League
Meizhou Huijun

New teams
Chongqing Lander
Donghua University
Hebei Aoli Jingying

Name changes

Stadiums and Locations

Foreign players

League table

Relegation play-offs

Notes

References

External links
Season

2019
2018–19 domestic women's association football leagues
2019–20 domestic women's association football leagues
+